Winsor is a settlement in the municipality of New-Wes-Valley in Newfoundland and Labrador.

Winsor Family

The community is named for the John Winsor (1759-1822) who first settled in nearby Swain's Island in 1810.

During the 19th and early 20th Century many members of the Winsor family became involved in sealing, working as steamer captains:

 William Winsor, Sr
 Jesse Winsor
 Samuel Winsor

Descendants of John Winsor served in pre-Confederation House of Assembly of the Newfoundland as for Bonavista Bay and Bonavista North:

 Robert G. Winsor - Liberal MHA 1874-1878
 William C. Winsor - Conservative MHA 1882-1885
 William C. Winsor - Newfoundland People's Party MHA and Dominion Government cabinet minister
 Robert G. Winsor - Fishermen's Protective Union MHA
 Nathan G. Winsor - MHA and Executive Councillor

References

Populated places in Newfoundland and Labrador